Tío Gamboín (born Ramiro Gamboa) was a popular Mexican television host. He is mostly remembered for presenting Televisa's cartoon programming on Canal 5 on weekday evenings, where he would read letters from fans and display a collection of different mechanical figurines, some of which became famous in their own right. Fans who wished to join Gamboin's club would become his "nieces and nephews" and accordingly, Gamboín would become their "uncle" or Tío, hence the moniker "Tío Gamboín".

Gamboin, Tio
Possibly living people
Year of birth missing